Deerfield Beach station, also known as the Old Deerfield Beach Seaboard Air Line Railway Station, is a train station in Deerfield Beach, Florida. It is served by Amtrak intercity rail and Tri-Rail commuter rail trains.

Located at 1300 West Hillsboro Boulevard (SR 810), just east of North Military Trail (SR 809), the station was built in 1926 by the Seaboard Air Line Railway. It shares the same Mediterranean Revival design as the Delray Beach Seaboard station and the Homestead Seaboard station. Those design features include arched entryways, arcades, stucco walls and a barrel-tiled roof. The station was placed on the U.S. National Register of Historic Places on April 5, 1990. It serves the nearby Boca Raton community .

The historic Seaboard Air Line Railway Station also houses the South Florida Railway Museum, which is open to the public on Wednesdays and Saturdays.

In 2010, the Florida Department of Transportation finished a restoration of the historic station. The $380,000 project included a new roof, interior improvements to the lobby and restrooms, repairs to the exterior walls and installation of new air conditioning units.

Station layout 
The station has two side platforms, with parking lots on either side. Buses stop along a bus loop to the west of the southbound platform, while the station house sits adjacent to the northbound platform. A sidewalk grade crossing at the north end of the station provides access between platforms.

References

External links 

Deerfield Beach Station South Florida Regional Transportation Authority
Deerfield Beach Amtrak/Tri-Rail Station  (USA Rail Guide – TrainWeb)
South Florida Railway Museum

Deerfield Beach
Deerfield Beach
National Register of Historic Places in Broward County, Florida
D
Tri-Rail stations in Broward County, Florida
Deerfield Beach, Florida
Deerfield Beach
1926 establishments in Florida